The 2007 Nigerian House of Representatives elections in Kwara State was held on April 21, 2007, to elect members of the House of Representatives to represent Kwara State, Nigeria.

Overview

Summary

Results

Asa/Ilorin West 
PDP candidate Suleiman Nimota O won the election, defeating other party candidates.

Baruten/Kaiama 
PDP candidate Maimunat Adaji won the election, defeating other party candidates.

Edu/Moro/Patigi 
PDP candidate Aliyu Ahman-Pategi won the election, defeating other party candidates.

Ekiti/Isin/Irepodun/Oke-ero 
PDP candidate Makanjuola G.P won the election, defeating other party candidates.

Ilorin East/South 
PDP candidate Abdul-Wahab Oladimeji Isa won the election, defeating other party candidates.

Offa/Oyun/Ifelodun 
PDP candidate Kolawole A Yusuf won the election, defeating other party candidates.

References 

Kwara State House of Representatives elections